Stara  is a village in the administrative district on Gmina Aleksandrów, within Piotrków County, Łódź Voivodeship, in central Poland.

The village has a population of 160.

References

Stara